Kirsten Michaelsen (born 16 June 1943) is a retired Danish swimmer. She competed at the 1960 and 1964 Summer Olympics in the 100 m backstroke event, but failed to reach the finals.

References

1943 births
Living people
Danish female backstroke swimmers
Olympic swimmers of Denmark
Swimmers at the 1960 Summer Olympics
Swimmers at the 1964 Summer Olympics
Swimmers from Copenhagen